Colonel Reginald Rodney Myers (November 26, 1919 – October 23, 2005) was a United States Marine Corps officer who received the Medal of Honor for his heroism in Korea as a major  — for fearlessly leading 250 United Nations troops to victory over 4,000 of the enemy in November 1950 during the Battle of Chosin Reservoir.

The battle occurred on November 29, 1950, as the Chinese communists threatened to envelop the United States X Corps forces at the Chosin Reservoir. The success of Major Myers' mission proved vital to the defense of Hagaru-ri. He was presented the Nation's highest military decoration by President Harry S. Truman during ceremonies at the White House on October 29, 1951.

Early years
Reginald Rodney Myers was born on November 26, 1919, in Boise, Idaho. He received his early schooling and graduated from high school in Salt Lake City, Utah. He graduated from the University of Idaho in  Moscow, Idaho, in June 1941 with a Bachelor of Science degree in Mechanical Engineering. He attained the rank of cadet colonel in the Reserve Officers Training Corps at the university. On September 1, 1941, he resigned his Army Reserve commission to accept appointment as a second lieutenant in the United States Marine Corps.

Myers was a member of Idaho Alpha Chapter of Sigma Alpha Epsilon.

Marine Corps service
Second Lieutenant Myers completed Marine Officers' Basic School at the Philadelphia Navy Yard, then served as a company commander at the Marine Corps Base, San Diego, California.

World War II
He was promoted to first lieutenant in October 1942, and to captain in April 1943. Returning briefly to the United States in October 1944, he was promoted to major in January 1945.

Major Myers again returned to the Pacific area in June 1945, and served with the 5th Marines, 1st Marine Division, during the assault on Okinawa, and in the landing on and occupation of Northern China.

Inter-war years
He returned to the United States in May 1946, and served at Mare Island, California, Norfolk, Virginia and Cherry Point, North Carolina. At Cherry Point, he served as Assistant G-4, Aircraft, Fleet Marine Force, Atlantic, and 2nd Marine Aircraft Wing, from August 1948 until May 1950.

Korean War
Ordered to Korea in July 1950, Major Myers served as executive officer, 3rd Battalion, 1st Marines, 1st Marine Division. For his part in the Inchon landing on September 15, 1950, he was awarded the Bronze Star  with Combat "V," and for his heroism in helping to rescue two wounded Marines four days later he was awarded a Gold Star in lieu of a second Bronze Star Medal. Although he emerged unscathed from the Hagaru-ri engagement which earned him the Medal of Honor, he was wounded in action on April 25, 1951.

Post-Korea
Major Myers returned to the United States in June 1951. That August he reported to the Basic School, Marine Corps Schools, Quantico, as a battalion commander. While stationed at Quantico, he was promoted to lieutenant colonel in December 1951. Assigned next to Washington, D. C., Lieutenant Colonel Myers served as Inspector-Instructor of the 5th Special Infantry Battalion, USMCR, from September 1952 through August 1953; and Inspector-Instructor, 13th Infantry Battalion, USMCR, from September 1953 through July 1955. Following this assignment, he entered the Senior School at Marine Corps Schools, Quantico, and completed the course in June 1956. Lieutenant Colonel Myers remained at Quantico until April 1958, serving as commanding officer, Headquarters and Service Battalion, and executive officer, Basic School, respectively.

From July 1958 until August 1961, he was assigned as assistant naval attache at the American Embassy in London, England. During this assignment, he was promoted to colonel in July 1960. In September 1961, Colonel Myers was assigned to the Office of the Chief of Naval Operations, serving as head, International Plans Section, Strategic Plans Division, until June 1963. The following month, he joined the 3rd Marine Division on Okinawa for duty as troop exercise coordinator until June 1964. Upon his return to the United States, he completed the Industrial College of the Armed Forces in July 1965. He received his Master of Science degree in business administration from The George Washington University in September 1965. Colonel Myers was assigned duty at Headquarters Marine Corps with the G–L Division in August 1965. He served briefly as director, Marine Corps Personnel Research and Analysis Office, then as executive officer to the assistant chief of staff, G–L.

Colonel Myers retired from active duty in the Marine Corps on May 1, 1967. He died on October 23, 2005, and was buried in Arlington National Cemetery, Arlington, Virginia.

Awards and decorations
The colonel's medals and decorations include: the Medal of Honor; the Legion of Merit; the Bronze Star Medal with Combat "'V" and one Gold Star in lieu of second award, the Letter of Commendation With Combat "V;" the Purple Heart; the Presidential Unit Citation with three bronze stars indicative of second through fourth awards; the American Campaign Medal; the World War II Victory Medal; the Navy Occupation Service Medal with Asia clasp; the China Service Medal; the National Defense Service Medal; the Korean Service Medal with one silver star indicative of five bronze stars; the United Nations Service Medal; and the Korean Presidential Unit Citation.

Medal of Honor citation
The President of the United States takes pleasure in presenting the MEDAL OF HONOR to

for service as set forth in the following CITATION:

For conspicuous gallantry and intrepidity at the risk of his life above and beyond the call of duty as Executive Officer of the Third Battalion, First Marines, First Marine Division (Reinforced), in action against enemy aggressor forces in Korea on November 29, 1950. Assuming command of a composite unit of Army and Marine service and headquarters elements totalling approximately 250 men, during a critical stage in the vital defense of the strategically important military base at Hagaru-ri, Major Myers immediately initiated a determined and aggressive counterattack against a well-entrenched and clearly concealed enemy force numbering an estimated 4,000. Severely handicapped by a lack of trained personnel and experienced leaders in his valiant efforts to regain maximum ground prior to daylight, he persisted in constantly exposing himself to intense, accurate and sustained hostile fire in order to direct and supervise the employment of his men and to encourage and spur them on in pressing the attack. Inexorably moving forward up the steep, snow-covered slope with his depleted group in the face of apparently insurmountable odds, he concurrently directed artillery and mortar fire with superb skill and, although losing 170 of his men during fourteen hours of raging combat in sub-zero temperatures, continued to reorganize his unit and spearhead the attack which resulted in 600 enemy killed and 500 wounded. By his exceptional and valorous leadership throughout, Major Myers contributed directly to the success of his unit in restoring the perimeter. His resolute spirit of self sacrifice and unfaltering devotion to duty enhance and sustain the highest traditions of the United States Naval Service.

/S/ HARRY S. TRUMAN

Medal of Honor flag presentation

On August 3, 2006, in a ceremony at the Marine barracks in Washington, D.C., General Michael Hagee presented the Medal of Honor flag to Myers' widow.

See also

List of Medal of Honor recipients
List of Korean War Medal of Honor recipients
Battle of Chosin Reservoir

References

1919 births
2005 deaths
United States Marine Corps officers
United States Marine Corps personnel of World War II
United States Marine Corps personnel of the Korean War
Korean War recipients of the Medal of Honor
United States Marine Corps Medal of Honor recipients
Recipients of the Legion of Merit
George Washington University School of Business alumni
Burials at Arlington National Cemetery
People from Boise, Idaho